Jefferson Township is one of the sixteen townships of Crawford County, Ohio, United States. As of the 2010 census there were 1,576 people living in the township, 1,515 of whom were in the unincorporated portions of the township.

Geography
Located in the southeastern part of the county, it borders the following townships:
Sandusky Township - north
Vernon Township - northeast
Jackson Township - east
Polk Township - south
Whetstone Township - west

Parts of two villages are located in Jefferson Township: Crestline in the east, and North Robinson in the west. Jefferson Township contains the unincorporated communities of Leesville and Middletown.

Name and history
Jefferson Township was established in 1873. It was named for President Thomas Jefferson.

It is one of twenty-four Jefferson Townships statewide.

Government
The township is governed by a three-member board of trustees, who are elected in November of odd-numbered years to a four-year term beginning on the following January 1. Two are elected in the year after the presidential election and one is elected in the year before it. There is also an elected township fiscal officer, who serves a four-year term beginning on April 1 of the year after the election, which is held in November of the year before the presidential election. Vacancies in the fiscal officership or on the board of trustees are filled by the remaining trustees.

References

External links
County website

Townships in Crawford County, Ohio
Townships in Ohio